The Puijo tower is an observation tower at the top of Puijo hill in Kuopio, Eastern Finland. It was the first tower with a revolving restaurant in the Nordic countries. The restaurant was an inspiration to Erkki Lindfors, the mayor of Tampere, who got the idea to build a similar one in his home town, resulting in the Näsinneula tower, which opened in 1971. The current Puijo tower has been visited by over 5.5 million tourists.

The current tower is the third overall. When it was completed on 27 July 1963, the second one, built in 1906, was dismantled. The first tower was built in 1856. On the western side of the tower there are three ski jumping hills.

Gallery

References

External links

 
Puijo Tower – Official website  (in Finnish, English and Russian)

Towers completed in 1963
Observation towers in Finland
Kuopio
Towers with revolving restaurants
Buildings and structures in North Savo
Tourist attractions in North Savo